Jenő Ébert (born 16 July 1946) is a Hungarian former figure skater. He is a seven-time Hungarian national champion. He competed at the 1964 Winter Olympics in Innsbruck and at the 1968 Winter Olympics in Grenoble.

Competitive highlights

References 

1946 births
Figure skaters at the 1964 Winter Olympics
Figure skaters at the 1968 Winter Olympics
Hungarian male single skaters
Living people
Figure skaters from Budapest
Olympic figure skaters of Hungary